XXY is the condition of having two X chromosomes and one Y chromosome
 Klinefelter syndrome in males

Other meanings of XXY 
 XXY (film), a drama film about an intersex person
 XXY (album), an album by The Young Gods
 XXY, a New York dance and music troupe consisting of Cyndi Lee, Mary Ellen Strom and Pierce Turner that did the choreography for Cyndi Lauper's music-video to Girls Just Want to Have Fun